Wood Farm is a residential district of Oxford, England, south of Headington in the southeast of the city. It largely consists of social housing built in the 1950s and 1960s, originally intended to house workers from the nearby car factory. The Eastern By-Pass is to the east, Cowley is to the southwest and Headington Quarry is to the north.

Services
Oxford City Council organizes street wardens in the area. Wood Farm has a Community Centre in Titup Hall Drive. Wood Farm has a primary school.

The area also has regular bus services to Oxford city centre as well as Headington, Cowley, Botley, and Abingdon.

References

Areas of Oxford